The Sungi River is a river on Bali, Indonesia. Its source is located in the mountainous area in the central-northern part of Bali. It flows through the ancient site of Mengwi and enters the sea to the west of Kerobokan Kelod on the southern coast.

The Sungi River forms most of the eastern boundary of the Tabanan Regency and provides irrigation water for 4,200 ha of sawah (rice paddies) within one regency (kabupaten) alone.

History 
The first King of Mengwi, the Lord of Balayu, built a dam over the Sungi River. According to Henk Schulte Nordholt, this dam was very important for the economy along the river bank, providing needed irrigation for the people to prosper.

Geography
The river flows in the middle to the south of Bali with predominantly tropical rainforest climate (designated as Af in the Köppen-Geiger climate classification). The annual average temperature in the area is 24 °C. The warmest month is October, when the average temperature is around 25 °C, and the coldest is July, at 22 °C. The average annual rainfall is 2123 mm. The wettest month is January, with an average of 569 mm rainfall, and the driest is September, with 23 mm rainfall.

See also
 List of bodies of water in Bali
 List of rivers of Indonesia
 List of rivers of Lesser Sunda Islands

References

Rivers of Bali
Rivers of Indonesia